OK, Il Prezzo è Giusto! ("OK! The Price Is Right") is the Italian adaptation of the American game show The Price Is Right that aired on Italia 1, Canale 5 and Rete 4. It was hosted by Gigi Sabani, Iva Zanicchi, Emanuela Folliero and Maria Teresa Ruta with the first version being hosted by a man (Sabani) then the later three versions were hosted by women (Zanicchi, Folliero and Ruta respectively) with Zanicchi being the longest-running to hold the title for 13 years. It first premiered on 21 December 1983 and went off the air on 13 April 2001. With 3,466 episodes it is the third longest running quiz on Italian TV, after L'eredità (The Inheritance) and La Ruota Della Fortuna (The Wheel of Fortune). The show used similar gameplay format to the American version, although at the two last seasons altered the format to use the British One-Player showcase format. It is the only version to feature an all female cast.

Zanicchi, Folliero, and Ruta's tenures as hosts make the Italian version of one only three versions of the show to be hosted by a woman.  However, the first host of the show was a man (Sabani).

Pricing Games 
The name of the original pricing game in the US version (or in the case of Le Bowling, the French version) is given in parentheses. Many of these follow the same rules and gameplay as the US version; for details, see List of The Price Is Right pricing games.

10 Chances (Ten Chances)
2 Al Prezzo di 1 (2 For The Price Of 1)
2 Metà (Money Game)
3 X (3 Strikes)
Abbinamento (It's in the Bag)
Accoppiata (Pick-A-Pair)
Alveare (Spelling Bee)
Assegno in Bianco (Check Game)
Astronave (On The Nose)
Black-Jack (Hit Me)
Blocca il Prezzo (Freeze Frame)
Bowling (Le Bowling)
Cambio (Switcheroo)
Campana (One Away)
Caro Prezzo (Most Expensive)
Carta Di Credito (Credit Card)
Carta Vincente (Card Game)
Cassaforte (Safe Crackers)
Centro (Bullseye)
Check-Out
Chiave Magica (Master Key)
Colpo Sicuro (Hole In One)
Conchiglia (Shell Game)
Corsa Il Prezzo (Race Game)
Cover Up
Esploratore (Pathfinder)
Formichina (Super Saver)
Fai La Mossa Giusta (Make Your Move)
Febbre Dell'Oro (Range Game)
Gioco dei Dadi (Dice Game)
Gioco dell'8 (Lucky Seven)
Grande Gioco/Vinci Gli Zeri (Grand Game, Lit. 5,000,000 or Lit. 10,000,000 top prize.)
Il Tempo è Denaro (Clock Game)
Inflazione (Now...Or Then)
Jolly (Bonus Game)
Mini Market (Grocery Game)
Numero Magico (Magic Number)
Occhio Al Prezzo (I) (Double Prices)
Occhio Al Prezzo (II) (One Right Price)
Offerta Speciale (Barker's Bargain Bar)
Più o Meno (Hi-Lo)
Poker (Poker Game)
Plinko (Lit. 5,000,000 top prize. Also, contestants can have a chance to win a car if scored Lit. 2,000,000 or more.)
Prendere o Lasciare (Give Or Keep)
Prova del 5 (Five Price Tags)
Punchingball (Punch-A-Bunch)
Salvadanaio (Any Number)
Scogliera (Cliff Hangers)
Solo Due (Take Two)
Squeeze (Squeeze Play)
Superball
Telefono Casa (Phone Home Game)
Tentazione (Temptation)
Trappola (Danger Price)
Tris (Secret X)
Via Dell'Oro (Golden Road)

OK! Exclusives 
Chi Dei Due
Girasole (Lit. 5,000,000 top prize)
Gran Menù
Le Stelle In Gioco
Super Vincita
Jukebox

Showcase Showdown 
The Big Wheel in the Italian version is played the same as in the US version (after expanded to 1 hour in 1975). The bonus for 100 points in one spin was  Lit. 1,000,000 (€516.46). Both winners play the Showcase (in the 2-player version); since 1999, after 2 SCSDs, the two winners must play a spin-off to determine who will play the Showcase (in the 1-player version).

Showcase 
The showcase was largely played like the American Version, hoping that the contestant make the closest bid without going over, and awarding both showcases to a player who came within Lit. 100,000.  Starting in 1999, the showcase was played in the same way of the UK/European version, with random ranges between Lit. 500,000 (€258.23) and Lit. 2,500,000 (€1291.15); contestants would randomly select one of these ranges, hoping that their bid fell within the selected range of the actual price without going over.  If it did, they won the showcase.

Seasons

References

Link
Official Website

The Price Is Right
Italian game shows
Italian television series based on American television series
Television series by Fremantle (company)
Italia 1 original programming